Dłużyna may refer to the following places:
Dłużyna, Greater Poland Voivodeship (west-central Poland)
Dłużyna, Warmian-Masurian Voivodeship (north Poland)
Dłużyna, West Pomeranian Voivodeship (north-west Poland)